A Bachelor of Environmental Design, (B.EnvD.), is an undergraduate course of study. Similar in nature to a pre-law degree, a B.EnvD is designed as preparatory undergraduate training for a professional course of study in architecture, landscape architecture, or urban planning, and is one of several degrees offered as preparatory training for the Master of Architecture degree. An alternative three-year Master of Architecture exists for people with a bachelor's degree not related to design, the M.Arch I degree. A Bachelor of Environmental Design should not be confused with a Bachelor in Environmental Studies, which though similar, does not train one for graduate professional study in architecture, landscape design, or urban planning. Environmental Design degree programs generally take four years of full-time study to complete, and many institutions allow a specialty emphasis within urban planning, architecture or landscape architecture. Other pre-professional degrees include the B.S. in Architectural Studies, B.A. in Architecture, the B.S. in Architecture, and the B.S. in Construction Management. Though the Bachelor of Environmental Design is not accredited by the National Architectural Accrediting Board NAAB, like other college degrees, programs in Environmental Design are accredited through their host-institution schools by various regional agencies, such as the Middle States Association of Colleges and Schools, or the North Central Association of Colleges and Schools. The Bachelor of Environmental Design should not be confused with the M.Arch or the five-year accredited B.Arch degree.

Purpose and nature of training 

Modern environmental design began as a series of separate disciplines that intersect between the professional worlds of architecture, product design, and the eco/environmental movement. Intersecting disciplines of similar philosophies include permaculture, complementary gardening, sustainable agriculture, zero-energy building design, passive solar architecture, pollution mitigation,  cradle-to-grave, open space preservation, New Urbanism, sustainable transportation and traffic planning, multi-modal transportation design etc. With the development of a bachelor's degree, these various different disparate fields are brought together in a unified, but interdisciplinary field of environmental design. In the academic world, environmental design may cross disciplines with departments of geography, environmental science, climatology, neuroscience, and various others. The most publicly known example of environmental design is LEED certified design, which stands for Leadership in Energy and Environmental Design. Sustainable design is rapidly being adopted by governments around the world. On October 28th, 2010, the U.S. General Services Administration moved to mandate LEED certification in all new federal buildings.

List of environmental design degree–granting institutions 

 Art Center College of Design
 Arizona State University, Herberger Institute of Design
 Auburn University, College of Architecture Design and Construction
  Cal Poly Pomona, College of Environmental Design
 Cornell University, Department of Design and Environmental Analysis
 Montana State University, School of Architecture
 North Carolina State University, School of Architecture
 North Dakota State University, Department of Architecture and Landscape Architecture
 Ontario College of Art and Design, Department of Environmental Design
 Stony Brook University, Sustainability Studies Program
 The University of Oklahoma, The Gibbs College of Architecture|Environmental design /architecture.ou.edu/environmental/
 Texas A%26M College of Architecture
 Texas Tech University
 University of Colorado at Boulder, Environmental Design
 University at Buffalo, Department of Urban and Regional Planning 
 University of Hawaii at Manoa, School of Architecture 
 University of Houston, Gerald D. Hines College of Architecture
 University of Massachusetts Amherst
University of Minnesota, College of Design
 University of Puerto Rico, School of Architecture
 University of British Columbia, SALA
 Dalhousie University
 University of Manitoba
 Griffith University
 Rutgers University, Department of Landscape Architecture

See also 

 List of environmental degrees
 Bachelor of Architecture
 Master of Architecture
 Bachelor of Environmental Studies
 Bachelor of Environmental Science
 Bachelor of Science in Landscape Architecture
 Master of Landscape Architecture
 Urban planning education

References 

Environmental design